Thoongaa Vanam is a 2015 Indian action thriller film directed by Rajesh M. Selva. The film stars Kamal Haasan, Prakash Raj, Trisha, Kishore, Sampath Raj, and Yugi Sethu, while Aman Abdullah, Asha Sharath,  Madhu Shalini, and Jagan play supporting roles. It is filmed simultaneously in Tamil and Telugu languages, the latter titled Cheekati Rajyam. Both versions were produced by Raaj Kamal Films International and Sree Gokulam Movies. The film is a remake of the French film Sleepless Night (2011).

Thoongaa Vanam was released on 10 November 2015 coinciding with Diwali while the Telugu version Cheekati Rajyam was released on 20 November 2015. The film received positive reviews from critics.

Plot
C.K Diwakar is an IRS officer in the NCB, who along with his deputy Mani, busts a narcotics scam. In retaliation, Vittal Rao, a drug smuggler who had masterminded the scam, kidnaps Diwakar's son Vasu. He is willing to release Vasu if Diwakar can return to him a bag of cocaine that he seized while thwarting the scam.

With no other option at hand, Diwakar agrees and proceeds to Vittal's nightclub, with the bag of cocaine, where Vasu is held hostage. His act of hiding the bag in the men's toilet is noticed by his colleague Mallika, who becomes suspicious. Thinking that Diwakar is involved in drug smuggling, she informs her superior Dhiraviyam. Both begin to pursue Diwakar, taking away the bag of cocaine from the toilet in the process.

When Diwakar realises that the bag of cocaine has gone missing, he decides to return to Vittal a bag containing packets of maida instead, thinking that he and his cronies, including a gangster named Pedha Babu, will not realise the difference. Unfortunately, Vittal and Pedha soon find out that Diwakar had cheated them and decide to kill him.

Caught between Vittal's gang on one side and Mallika and Dhiraviyam on the other side, Diwakar confronts Mallika and tells her that contrary to her suspicions, he has been working undercover and had planned the entire operation to expose cops such as Dhiraviyam and even Mani, who are involved in drug smuggling. Diwakar then rescues Vasu without Vittal's knowledge, and Vittal is also arrested by Mallika and Dhiraviyam.

While taking Vittal to prison, Mallika finds out that she has Mani's mobile phone, and on reading the messages in it, she finds out that Diwakar had been speaking the truth all along, realising that Dhiraviyam and Mani are involved in drug smuggling and had tried to frame Diwakar. Though Dhiraviyam tries to resist arrest, killing Vittal in the process, he is eventually brought to justice.
 	
Three months later, Mallika is now Diwakar's deputy, and the duo is shown thwarting the attempted murder of a police officer.

Cast 

 Kamal Haasan as C.K Diwakar
 Prakash Raj as Vittal Rao
 Trisha as Mallika
 Kishore as Dhiraviyam
 Sampath Raj as Pedha Babu
 Yugi Sethu as Mani
 Asha Sharath as Dr. Sujatha Diwakar, C.K Diwakar's wife
 Aman Abdullah as Vasu Diwakar, C.K Diwakar's son
 Madhu Shalini as Esther (nurse)
 Jagan as Jagan
 Uma Riyaz Khan as Maheswari
 Guru Somasundaram as Duraipandian
 Santhana Bharathi as Thandapani (Tamil version) 
 Ramajogayya Sastry as Subba Rao (Telugu version)
 Chaams as Chef
 Suka as Mandhiramoorthy
 Rajesh Selva as Head Chef

Production

Pre-production
Kamal Haasan announced that his next project, a bilingual thriller titled Thoongaa Vanam in Tamil, would be directed by his former assistant Rajesh Selva and produced by himself. The film was initially titled as Ore Iravu, before going through a change of title. Kamal Haasan was very glad to be a part of the film and expressed his thanks to all who supported him in his career. He added that the film would be shot simultaneously and with the same cast and crew as Cheekati Rajyam in the Telugu language. Sanu Varghese and Shan Mohammed were named as the cinematographer and editor, respectively, while Ghibran was recruited as the film's composer, working on the fourth successive Kamal Haasan film. Writer Suka was chosen to write the Tamil dialogues, while Abburi Ravi was assigned to work on the dialogues for the Telugu version.

Kamal Haasan was reported to be play CK Dhiwakar, an Indian Revenue Service officer in Narcotics Control Bureau. Trisha and Prakash Raj were the first actors to be cast and reported to play the female lead and an important supporting role respectively. While Prakash Raj was said to portray a drug dealer named Vital Rao, Trisha's role was Mallika, a police officer. Initially, the makers were considering Bollywood actress Manisha Koirala to play Kamal's wife in the movie. But the crew later opted for Asha Sarath, after watching her films. Uma Riyaz Khan was signed for an "important role"  and Kishore informed that had been selected for a "key role" in the film. In June 2015, it was reported that Madhu Shalini was part of the film and had starting filming, while Sampath Raj was also added to the cast. Sampath's character was revealed to be that of a local gangster called Pedha Babu.

Filming
Following a photo shoot at the AVM Studios on 20 May 2015, the film was officially unveiled on 25 May in Hyderabad with the release of the first look poster, after which principal photography began with a schedule at the Ramoji Film City in Hyderabad. The filming was completed in 38 days by August 2015.

Soundtrack 

The soundtrack album for Thoongaa Vanam composed by Ghibran, features only one song, "Neeye Unakku Raja" in the heavy metal genre, written by Vairamuthu and sung by Kamal Haasan, with backing vocals by Yazin Nizar and model-turned-singer Aishvarrya. The song was released on 7 October 2015, along with its video song being simultaneously released on YouTube.

Behindwoods reviewing for the song stated that "Kamal’s textured voice and the glitch mode is on full throttle for this house-mix song, Ghibran’s toxic instrumentation takes us into a trance land of no hope and support. Be it the Veenai in the interlude or the numerous sound effects, the electronic influence in the composition, teamed up with some growling, bowls us over throughout. The female voice is no less, and particularly the metal-like singing is a whole new try." and gave a verdict, "Though it's just one, it's a gun!"

The Telugu version of the song named "Dhairyam Veedi" written by Ramajogayya Sastry was released, on 3 November 2015.

Reception

Thoongaa Vanam
Gautaman Bhaskaran of Hindustan Times gave the film a rating of 4/5 stars, calling it "an absolute slick crime adventure". Latha Srinivasan of Daily News and Analysis gave 3.5/5 stars mentioning Thoongaa Vanam as a slick, well-made film that takes you through the course of happening over one night to the police officer and appreciated the debutant Rajesh M. Selva for directing a film that broke from the regular Kollywood films. They also appreciated the performance of Kamal Haasan, Trisha and music director Gibran for the excellent background score. Avinash Gopinath of Filmibeat gave 3.5/5 stars and concluded "Without any songs and romantic sequences,  is not your regular Tamil film. After all, who else other than Kamal Haasan can make a Kollywood flick look truly international?"

Rating it 3/5 stars, S. Saraswathi of Rediff appreciated the performances of the lead cast as well as the film's technical aspects but criticised the lack of pace in the film's screenplay before concluding "the intriguing plot, good performances, Ghibran's innovative background score and camera angles of Sanu Varghese make director Rajesh M. Selva's  worth a watch." M. Suganth of The Times of India also rated the film 3/5 and wrote, "even though the film cleverly spreads the action across various areas in the club [...] it isn't enough to shake off the feeling of claustrophobia. By the time the film gets over, we feel exhausted." Entertainment website Behindwoods rated it 2.75/5, mentioning it as "There are thrills and surprises worth experiencing in this Thoongavanam", but also wrote "If one has to complain, it must be about the slightly slower pace of the movie", a contradictory statement when compared with general opinion. They appreciated the technicians as well as actors of the film with special mention to Trisha, and Aman Abdullah. Karthik Keramalu of IBNLive gave 2.5/5 stars and wrote, "Actors move in and out of rooms, run this way and that, plot and fail, hide and seek. Yet all the effort of the cast and crew is shaken and not stirred enough as the screenplay gets a few nods wrong."

Baradwaj Rangan of The Hindu stated that the film picks up in the post-interval portions "the kitchen-sink action choreography, the sounds of things breaking and clattering, the bursts of background score, the jittery camerawork", concluding the film as "an okay thriller", but criticised director Rajesh Selva for not giving the output to the dazzle of Brian De Palma films. Sify described the film as a "classy thriller that gives an edge of the seat ride with world class action sequences and no-nonsense execution!". Kamal Haasan, Prakash Raj, Sampath Raj, Kishore and Trisha were appreciated for their performances, while they concluded mentioning about the technical aspects like music, action, editing and camera work that gave an edge to the film. Raisa Nasreen of Bookmyshow termed the film as "A solid action-thriller".

Cheekati Rajyam

The Telugu version was released a week later with similar positive reviews. Sangeetha Devi Dundoo of The Hindu stated, 'though the film isn't really exceptional, makes for an engaging watch', appreciating director on the promising debut. She also mentioned the performance of Kamal Haasan, Prakash Raj and Trisha as good, concluding the film as a stylish cop drama as attention is paid even to little details of the film making. Rating it 3/5 stars, Pravallika Anjuri of filmibeat stated that, even though the film is not up to the standard of an edgy or racy thriller, the performance of artistes, ideal run time and presentation makes it a must watch. 123 Telugu gave the film a rating of 3.25/5 stars, calling it as a slick action thriller with interesting moments going on its way with a racy first half, concluding as the film is a must watch for those who like action thrillers and for the rest, the film is a decent watch.

Box office

References

External links

2015 films
2010s Tamil-language films
2015 action thriller films
Indian multilingual films
Films scored by Mohamaad Ghibran
Films with screenplays by Kamal Haasan
Indian action thriller films
Films about drugs
Films about kidnapping in India
Films about hostage takings
Films about human trafficking in India
Indian remakes of French films
Indian crime thriller films
2015 multilingual films
2015 crime thriller films
2010s Telugu-language films
Films about the Narcotics Control Bureau